Colonnade Row, also known as LaGrange Terrace, on present-day Lafayette Street in New York City's NoHo neighborhood, is a landmarked series of Greek revival buildings originally built in the early 1830s. They are believed to have been built by Seth Geer, although the project has been attributed to a number of other architects. The buildings' original name comes from the Marquis de Lafayette's estate in France, but the series of nine row houses, of which four remain, owe their existence to John Jacob Astor, who bought the property and whose grandson John Jacob Astor III later lived at No. 424. The buildings are listed on the National Register of Historic Places under the name LaGrange Terrace and the facades remain standing on Lafayette Street south of Astor Place.

Design

The nine original buildings, a series of Greek revival townhouses  built by Seth Geer, a contractor from Albany, New York (whose name is also given as "Greer") were located at 418–426 Lafayette Place on the site of the Vauxhall Gardens Amusement Park. The property on which these buildings were constructed had been bought by Astor in 1804 for $45,000, and when the lease for the Vauxhall Gardens was up, Astor built a wide street through the property from Great Jones Street to Art Street, which is now Astor Place, and named it Lafayette Place after the Marquis de Lafayette, a hero of the American Revolution. The original name of the buildings was Lagrange or La Grange Terrace, named after Lafayette's country estate, one of many places named in his honor in New York City and elsewhere in the United States, after his triumphant return tour in 1824–25.

Their facades were made entirely of Westchester marble and linked with a colonnade of Corinthian columns providing the homes with their current name. The marble for the buildings was found at Sing Sing, where the convicts worked to cut it for use in construction.

The precise year of the buildings' construction, as well as the architect responsible are subject to some debate. The architects generally credited with Colonnade Row's design is Alexander Jackson Davis, Ithiel Town, and James Dakin, who were believed to have designed the homes for the Astor and Vanderbilt families. Town and Dakin are believed to have begun work on the project, which they called LaGrange Terrace, during the winter of 1831–32, during which they worked on a number of design projects. Davis is not believed to have played a role in the final construction of the building, which was completed in 1833 according to the Landmarks Commission, and there are some who believe that he did not work on the design at all.

Apart from John Jacob Astor III, Julia Gardiner, who would become President John Tyler's First Lady lived on Colonnade Row, as did Cornelius Vanderbilt, Washington Irving, and Warren Delano. In addition, Columbia Law School held classes for a time in the house that was once occupied by John Jacob Astor III.

Decline
At the time of their construction, Lafayette Place, which was then a cobblestone cul-de-sac, was the most fashionable area in New York City and one of the first to be developed in the city's expansion north of Canal Street. The upper-class demographics of the region shifted, and by 1860 Murray Hill was considered a better place to live, and the area around the former Lafayette Place fell into decline.

The original buildings located at 418–426 Lafayette Place were torn down following a failed proposal in 1902 to relocate the remaining structures to Bryant Park, after more than half were torn down to make room for Wanamaker's warehouse and department store. Some of the columns and decorative parts ended up in what is now known as Delbarton School, a Benedictine boys school in Morristown, New Jersey, located on the former estate of Luther Kountze.

Protection
The four buildings that remain, numbers 428, 430, 432, and 434 Lafayette Street, were among the first to be landmarked when New York City began doing so in 1965, despite having been sub-divided into apartments and commercial properties, altered and generally in poor condition. The public hearings regarding the landmarking were held on September 21, 1965 at which time a number of people supported the landmarking and the owners presented no objections. The buildings were added to the National Register of Historic Places in December 1976 after being nominated in August of the same year.

The owners (for 428 and 430, The Casper R. Callen Trust, c/o Salon Realty) have announced plans to restore the buildings as recently as 1995. However, this has not yet happened due in part to cost.

See also
 Astor Place Theatre

References

External links

 NYC Architecture images and description
 La Grange Terrace Historic American Buildings Survey, Library of Congress

Residential buildings on the National Register of Historic Places in Manhattan
Greek Revival architecture in New York City
Greek Revival houses in New York (state)
Houses completed in 1832
New York City Designated Landmarks in Manhattan
Astor Place